Dabu may refer to:

Places in China
Dabu County, county in Meizhou, Guangdong
Dabu, Ruyuan County, a town in Ruyuan County, Guangdong
Dabu, Gan County, village in Gan County, Ganzhou, Jiangxi
Dabu, Guilin City, village in Yanshan District, Guilin, Guangxi

Other
Agob language, also called Dabu, a Papuan language spoken in Western Province, Papua New Guinea
3611 Dabu, a minor planet discovered in 1981

See also
Dapu, Chiayi, township in Taiwan whose name would be spelled Dabu in Pinyin
Dabu-dabu, hot and spicy condiment found in the cuisine of Manado, North Sulawesi
Dabus, fictional group from the Dungeons & Dragons Planescape setting
DABUS, artificial intelligence system named as an inventor in two patent applications